Bingham may refer to:

Places

United Kingdom
 Bingham, Nottinghamshire, a town in England
 Bingham (wapentake), an historic district of Nottinghamshire, England
 Bingham, Edinburgh, a suburb in Scotland

United States
 Bingham, Georgia
 Bingham County, Idaho
 Bingham, Illinois
 Bingham, Maine, a town
 Bingham (CDP), Maine, a census-designated place
 Bingham Township, Clinton County, Michigan
 Bingham Township, Huron County, Michigan
 Bingham Township, Leelanau County, Michigan
 Bingham, Nebraska
 Bingham Township, Potter County, Pennsylvania
 Bingham, South Carolina
 Bingham, Utah
 Bingham Canyon, Utah
 Bingham Canyon Mine
 Bingham, West Virginia

Elsewhere
 Bingham (crater), on the Moon
 Bingham Glacier, Antarctica
 Bingham Peak, Antarctica

Other uses
 Bingham (surname)
 Bingham McCutchen, a former law firm
 Bingham plastic, a non-Newtonian material

See also
 Binghamton (disambiguation)